Sokolniki Park, named for the falcon hunt of the Grand Dukes of Muscovy formerly conducted there, is located in the eponymous Sokolniki District of Moscow. Sokolniki Park is not far from the center of the city, near Sokolnicheskaya Gate. The park gained its name from the Sokolnichya Quarter, the 17th-century home of the sovereign's falconers (sokol (сокол) is the Russian word for falcon). It was created by Tsar Alexei Mikhailovich (father of Peter the Great), a keen hunter who loved to go falconing in the area.

The park's current layout of clearings and alleys began under Tsar Peter the Great. In 1900 a "labyrinth", or network of alleys, was laid out.

Today Sokolniki is a typical Russian park, with an aging funfair and other amusements for children, and numerous fast food stalls all clustered near the main entrance. In summer the central alleyways are a mass of brightly colored formal flowerbeds, while the depths of the park are a wilderness home to pines and spruces, birches and oaks, limes and maples - all trees native to the Moscow region - as well as a number of non-indigenous trees, such as larches, cedars, walnut, red oaks, etc. The park's wildlife includes hares, squirrels and weasels, as well as 76 types of bird.

It was established as a public municipal park in 1878. From 1931 onwards Sokolniki has been developed as an official "park of culture and leisure". The park, with an area of six square kilometers, is also the most Western extension of a larger Losiny Ostrov natural reserve that spans from the Eastern edge of Sokolniki to MKAD ring road and beyond. The park territory contains an amusement park, a winter outdoor ice skating rink and an exposition centre which was the site of the Kitchen Debate between Richard Nixon and Nikita Khrushchev at the American National Exhibition in 1959. It also contains the Sokolniki Sports Palace, home to the ice hockey team HC Spartak Moscow. The soccer club in Sokolniki was the site of the 2006 murder of Central Bank executive Andrey Kozlov.

Culture institutions
 Contemporary museum of calligraphy

Sokolniki Chess Club
Sokolniki Park is famous for its chess club, which is located on the rotunda of the far end of the park's circle. The chess club produced some of the finest grandmasters of history. During the 1959 US-USSR expo, exhibition matches were held for the eyes of the US delegation, headed by then-Vice President Richard Nixon. In the 1970s, the then-little known engineer Natan Sharansky coached locals at the chess club. He would later go on to be a renowned refusenik activist and Israeli politician.

Sokolniki Exhibition and Convention Centre 
The Sokolniki Exhibition and Convention Centre is one of Moscow's venues to host some exhibitions and conferences. It is located in East Administrative District directly in Sokolniki Park for Leisure and Recreation. It is one of the oldest exhibition sites and the first to start exhibition industry in Russia.

References

Bibliography
 
 Cite Sokolniki Park

External links 

 

Parks and gardens in Moscow
Amusement parks in Russia
Cultural heritage monuments of regional significance in Moscow